Winfried W. Weber is a German economist and management professor. He is director of the Mannheim Institute of Applied Management Research at Mannheim University of Applied Sciences, with a research focus on new role models of management, global family business and entrepreneurship. Weber is founder of managemendenker.com, a blog on management practice, theory, and influential thinkers. Weber is the president and founder of a non-profit management network, the Peter Drucker Society of Mannheim E.V., whose aim is to strengthen the leadership and networks of managers.

Education 
Weber obtained his doctoral degree( PhD) in economics at Witten/Herdecke University; Reinhard Mohn is Chair for Corporate Governance, Business Ethics and Social Evolution.

Publications

Books 
 Weber, Winfried W. (2021, in preparation): Die Purpose-Wirtschaft, Mannheim
 Weber, Winfried W. (2016): Einführung in das Management von Non-Profit-Organisationen, Mannheim
 Weber, Winfried W. (2007): Complicate your life, Göttingen
 Weber, Winfried W. (2005): Innovation durch Injunktion – Warum man Innovationen nicht planen (lassen) kann, Göttingen
 Weber, Winfried W. (1998): Führung und Lernprozesse in mittelständischen Weltmarktunternehmen - neue Ansätze zur Unternehmensglobalisierung, Bremen
 Weber, Winfried W. (1996):  Kundennähe in mittelständischen Weltmarktunternehmen, Bremen
 Weber, Winfried W. (1991): Defizite internationalen Management-Trainings - zur Bedeutung interkultureller Kommunikationsprozesse, Chur/Zürich

Editor and co-editor 

 Weber, Winfried W., Ed. (2013): Versteht die Realwirtschaft noch, was die Finanzwirtschaft tut? Mannheim (in German and English language)
 Weber, Winfried W. (2010), Ed. with Gladius Kulothungan: Peter Drucker's Next Management. New Institutions, New Theories and Practices, Göttingen
 Weber, Winfried W., Ed. (2009): Peter Drucker – der Mann, der das Management geprägt hat. Erinnerungen und Ausblick zum 100. Geburtstag, Göttingen

Selected articles and interviews 
 A new Management Caravanserai – Learning from the German Model
 From hierarchical organizations to networks, Frankfurter Allgemeine Zeitung, Jan. 20th, 2014
 Germany's Midsize Manufacturers Outperform its Industrial Giants, Harvard Business Review, August 12, 2016
 Management-Guru Peter Drucker, Brandeins, September 2016 
 List of publications 
 Management training in the right context 
 Why are Mittelstand champions so successful? 
 Sennheiser: Motivated by the customer

References

External links

People from Tübingen
German economists
Living people
Year of birth missing (living people)